The International Penal and Penitentiary Foundation (IPPF;)  is an international organisation with quasi-governmental status.  It promotes studies on crime-prevention and treatment of offenders, focussing on research, publications and teaching.  It has been approved by the General Assembly of the United Nations and holds consultative status at the United Nations and the Council of Europe.

History 
The IPPF can trace its origin to 1872, when the International Prison Commission (according to some sources the International Penitentiary Commission) was set up to make recommendations for prison reform. This commission later became the International Penal and Penitentiary Commission (IPPC) and is considered the oldest intergovernmental agency in the correctional field. The IPPC was affiliated with the League of Nations and organised conferences on crime control every five years.

It produced the first set of minimum rules for the treatment of detainees (the Standard Minimum Rules for the Treatment of Prisoners), which were adopted by the League of Nations in 1934 and approved in 1955 at the first United Nations Congress on Crime Prevention and the Treatment of Offenders.

After World War II, the IPPC was dissolved and its role transferred to the United Nations. The International Penal and Penitentiary Foundation in its current form was established in 1950 as a foundation officially based in Switzerland, and has been approved by the General Assembly of the United Nations.

Current role 
The IPPF promotes studies on crime-prevention and treatment of offenders through research, publications, teaching and international meetings. The IPPF's members are experts in penal and penitentiary matters from around the world  such as judges, officials in the prison system, and academics.

The IPPF holds consultative status at the UN Commission on Crime Prevention and Criminal Justice, the United Nations Economic and Social Council,  and the Council of Europe. It provides recommendations and advice on safeguarding human rights and improving treatment under the penal system. Among its current priorities are a revision of minimum rules for the treatment of prisoners for Latin America and the Caribbean, and prison policy and prisoners' rights.

Organs

Council of the Foundation (IPPF Board)
The Council is the supreme body of the IPPF and is responsible for its administration. The Council also represents the Foundation with respect to third parties. It is composed of five members:
  Phillip Rapoza, President
  Dr. Piet Hein van Kempen, Secretary-General
  Dr. Manon Jendly, Treasurer
  Dr. Warren Young, Vice President
  Dr. José Luís Díez Ripollés, Vice President

Committees 
The work of the IPPF is split among three committees whose members are persons who have distinguished themselves in the field of crime prevention and the treatment of offenders. The Committees are as follow:

The Principal Committee (1st Committee) 
 This Committee comprises 75 seats and plays an advisory and consultative role with respect to the Council on the activities of the Foundation
 Members of this Committee must come from one of the 25 Member States that were represented on the IPPC (see below) 
 There can be a maximum of three members from each member state on this Committee

The Associates Committee (2nd Committee) 
 This Committee comprises not more than 75 seats and plays an advisory and consultative role on subjects submitted to it by the Council related to the Foundation's activities
 Members of this Committee are: a) from a non-member country; or b) are affiliated with a public or private international organisation that is relevant to the field of crime prevention and the treatment of offenders
 There can be a maximum of three members from each non-member country or organization on this Committee

The Fellows Committee (3rd Committee) 
 This Committee comprises an unlimited number of seats and plays an advisory and consultative role on subjects submitted to it by the Council relative to the Foundation’s activities
 Members of this Committee are former members of the Principal or Associates Committees who have expressed a wish to stay involved in the work of the Foundation

Auditing body 
The Council appoints this external and independent body to audit the accounts of the Foundation and the submit a detailed report to the Council for its approval. This body has the authority to report any defects it discovers to external surveillance authorities if the Council does not rectify them in a reasonable time.

Members 
The following countries were original members of the IPPC, and as such are granted the right to be represented in the First Committee:

References

External links
 Official website
 Records of the International Penal and Penitentiary Commission (1872-1955) at the United Nations Archives

International law organizations
Organizations established in 1950
Foundations based in Switzerland